Ron Aniello is an American songwriter, record producer, composer and musician who has enjoyed a diverse career working with Bruce Springsteen, Matthew Koma, Shania Twain, Wanting Qu, Gavin DeGraw, Lifehouse, Patti Scialfa, Barenaked Ladies, Guster, Jars of Clay, Bridgit Mendler, Sixpence None the Richer, Jude Cole, Vanessa Amorosi, Moshav Band and many more artists. In addition, Aniello has composed scores for film and television, and the Ringling Bros. and Barnum and Bailey Circus, and has been nominated for Grammy Awards.

He lives in Los Angeles and owns a recording studio there. He produces established and emerging artists in both Los Angeles and New York City. In 2013, he produced Wanting Qu's Say the Words, which produced three hit singles in Asia. Both Aniello and Wanting were nominated for a GMA as producers of "Love Ocean" for single of the year.

In January 2014, his work on Springsteen's High Hopes was number 1 in 22 countries including the United States and the UK with a four-star review from Rolling Stone magazine. Aniello's latest work includes co-writing Tiësto's "Written in Reverse" with Hardwell featuring Matthew Koma on A Town Called Paradise released June 13, 2014, in the UK and debuting at number 3.

Selected work

Honors and awards

Honors
 Singles
 2000 - Hanging by a Moment; No Name Face; Lifehouse - 2× Platinum
 Albums
 2000 - No Name Face; Lifehouse - 4× Platinum

Awards
 Grammy Awards
 2013 - Best Rock Album - Wrecking Ball - Nominated
 2013 - Best Rock Song - We Take Care of Our Own - Nominated
 2010 - Best Pop/Contemporary Gospel Album - The Long Fall Back to Earth; Jars of Clay; Essential Records - Nominated
 Dove Awards
 2010 - Pop/Contemporary Album of the Year - The Long Fall Back to Earth; Jars of Clay; Essential Records - Winner
 2007 - Rock/Contemporary Album of the Year - Good Monsters; Jars of Clay; Essential Records - Winner
 2003 - Modern Rock/Alternative Recorded Song of the Year - Spin; Stanley Climbfall; Lifehouse; Sparrow Records - Nominated
 2001 - Modern Rock Album of the Year - Jordan's Sister; Sparrow Records - Winner

References

American multi-instrumentalists
Record producers from Nevada
Living people
People from the Las Vegas Valley
Songwriters from Nevada
Year of birth missing (living people)